Limbé (known as Victoria from 1858 to 1982) is a seaside city in the South-West Region of Cameroon. At the 2005 Census, the population was 84,223.

Toponymy 
The city name Limbe is generally held to originate from a mispronunciation of the name of a German engineer called Limburgh. Oral narratives hold that this engineer is responsible for constructing a bridge across one of the rivers in the city. Over a period of time, this river came to be associated with this engineer. In 1982, a presidential decree signed by president Ahmadou Babatoura Ahidjo, a changed the city name from Victoria to Limbe.

History

Initially Victoria and its vicinity was not part of the new German colony Kamerun and remained under British administration. On May 7, 1886 Great Britain and Germany agreed to exchange Victoria and its vicinity for German rights at the Forcados River in Nigeria and St. Lucia, KwaZulu-Natal in South Africa. On March 28, 1887 Victoria and its vicinity were handed over to the German administration. At the same time Swiss Presbyterian missionaries bought the land from the Baptist Missionary Society in 1887.

Victoria became British again in 1915. In 1982 Victoria was renamed "Limbe" by Ahmadou Ahidjo.

Limbe was recently acknowledged by the Cameroonian government for its role played in the trade of slaves. The current site (Bimbia) is being restored for tourists, who would like to understand how slaves made their way from far distances to the coastal city.

Language

The Southwest Province's official language is English, although French is spoken due to the city's geographic proximity to Douala, where the official language is French. Most of the population speaks English and Cameroonian Pidgin English. The native language of the region is Bakweri and a smaller group from Wovia and Bimbia speak Bimbia or Isubu.

Main sights

Limbe is located on a  bay against the backdrop of a major mountain range. Black sand beaches make Limbe one of two coastal towns (Kribi being the other) that are popular among Western tourists.  Attractions include the Limbe Wildlife Centre and Limbe Botanical Gardens also the Bimbia slave trade route . The Germans left a Bismarck tower in the vicinity of Limbe. It is the home to the Bakweri people. 

Some variety of flowers at Limbe Botanical Gardens:

Transport 
Limbe was served by a terminal station of a  gauge plantation railway from Soppo, near Buea, of the West African Planting Society Victoria.

It is linked by the National Highway 3 (N3) to Yaoundé (via Tiko, Douala and Edea) and Idenau.

Limbe is also home to a small port which offers ferry services to Calabar, Bakassi and Douala. 
There is currently plans to upgrade it to a fully equipped commercial deep sea port with the creation of the Limbe Port authority.

Commerce 
Limbe is the center of Cameroon's oil industry. Other important industries are fishery and tourism.  The Port of Limbe is one of four commercial ports in Cameroon.

Economy 

In 2008, Limbe became the site of a cement works. The city is also host to the head office (located at Bota, Limbe) of one of Cameroon's largest companies known as the Cameroon Development Corporation (CDC). The head office is at Bota, Limbe. Limbe has the only oil refinery company SONARA. Bundes Construction is also the largest civil engineering company.  Limbe also has a non-operational natural sea port. Limbe, along with the rest of Cameroon, Central African Republic, and Chad, rely on all import / export activities through the port of Douala, the economic capital of Cameroon. Limbe, which is a viable tourist destination in Cameroon, has a number of tourist attractions such as the Limbe Wildlife Center, the Limbe Botanic Garden, and an extensive and almost unique dark sand public and private beaches. There are several small inns and motels, including the LK Hotel, Musango Beach Hotel, Atlantic Beach, Guest House, Park and Mirama, Trinity, Savoy Palms, and First International Inn (Fini). These accommodate both business and tourist guests. Amongst these, the LK Hotel is situated above a view (mile 4) of the Atlantic Ocean, a vantage point from which to view the sunsets that envelop the Atlantic Ocean, mount Cameroon and the Malabo Islands.

Sport
Limbe is a sport loving city especially football which is the most loved and supported sport discipline in the nation. The city is home to a number of football clubs such as Njala Quan Sports academy (NQSA) founded by Mr Henry Njala quan, Victoria United ( Commonly known as OPOPO), and Best Stars Academy just to name a few.
The construction of the Limbe Stadium in Limbe is planned, financed by the state-owned Chinese company, the Exim Bank of China.

Culture
Limbe City Council organizes an annual Festival of Arts and Culture. This event is popularly known as Limbe FESTAC and has been taking place annually since 2014. Activities during this event includes: a caravan to launch the event, fashion parade, election of Miss FESTAC, exhibition, canoe race, traditional dances, display of traditional dishes, etc. It attracts visitors from all corners of the country and even from abroad. Culture from Cameroon as well as neighboring African countries are displayed.

Twin towns – sister cities

Limbe is twinned with:
 Seattle, United States
 Saint John's, Antigua and Barbuda

See also 
 Government Bilingual High School Limbe
 National Comprehensive High School
 Railway stations in Cameroon
 Saker Baptist College
 , headquartered in Victoria

References

External links 

 Seattle-Limbe Sister City Association website

1858 establishments in the British Empire
Populated coastal places in Cameroon
Populated places established in 1858
Communes of Southwest Region (Cameroon)